Groove Squad Cheerleaders is a 2002 American animated television film produced by DIC Entertainment as part of the DIC Movie Toons series of movies, which debuted on Nickelodeon in the United States on November 24, 2002 and was later released on VHS and DVD by MGM Home Entertainment and eventually airing internationally on Disney Channel and Toon Disney. The titular squad consists of three high school cheerleaders and best friends, who end up gaining superpowers after being accidentally zapped by a jolt of electricity from a deranged mad scientist. With help from their team mascot and their hairstylist, a former Mi6-agent, the three cheerleaders learn to use their newfound powers while hiding their newfound identities, to become superheroines and defeat the power-hungry mad scientist, and also win the annual cheerleading competition. Notably, it was the only movie in DIC Movie Toons that was a completely original concept; it was neither based on an older cartoon nor adapted from a classic literature story. The film features famous celebrity Jennifer Love Hewitt as the voice of Chrissy.

Plot
Chrissy, Ping, and Mackenzie (nicknamed "Mac") are a trio of best friends and cheerleaders from Bay City High School in Bay City. The three are your typical teenage girls: they're concerned with their looks, boys, getting ready for school dances and are busy preparing for an upcoming cheerleading competition. But one day, while at a hair salon that's owned and operated by Chrissy's friend, Adrienne, the girls get zapped by a jolt of electricity, but a lot more changes than just their hairstyles. The jolt of electricity ends up giving the girls superpowers: Chrissy gains superhuman strength (and a red supersuit), Ping gains the ability to fly (and a blue supersuit), and Mac gains the power of X-ray vision (and a green supersuit). The girls soon find themselves facing a much greater responsibility than simply preparing for their upcoming cheerleading competition: thwarting the plans of total world domination by the evil Dr. Nightingale (who also happens to be the father of one of Chrissy, Ping, and Mac's fellow cheerleaders).

While the girls are excited to use their new powers to become superheroes (especially Chrissy), they soon learn that becoming a superhero won't be as simple as they think—they need to practice how to properly use their powers and work together as a team (especially since they each only have one superpower). Also, the girls' superpowers only be activated when they drink a fruit smoothie, which also triggers their transformations. Ultimately, the girls manage to defeat Dr. Nightingale and his cronies, at least for the time being, and they also manage to win the cheerleading competition they had spent most of the movie preparing for.

Popular teen lingo pervades this feature-length presentation that's packed with humorous detail like flower power hippies, a fully equipped car à la James Bond and an Austin Powers wannabe.

Release
The movie first aired in the United States on Nickelodeon and was broadcast internationally like Disney Channel and Toon Disney (most international regions) and Super RTL. It was released on DVD by MGM Home Entertainment on June 3, 2003, and re-released by Gaiam on February 12, 2008.

Characters

Main 
Chrissy (Jennifer Love Hewitt): The narrator of the story who, in addition to being the school cheerleading captain for Bay City High School, is also the leader of the titular superheroine group. She has blonde hair, blue eyes and fair skin, and gains the power of superhuman strength (and her supersuit is red). Chrissy has a strong rivalry with Star Nightingale, who desperately wants to replace Chrissy as their school's head cheerleader, while also having a strong crush on Fernando, a handsome foreign exchange student. While Chrissy can be a bit of a diva at time, she's ultimately a kind and friendly person and a good leader.

Ping (Valerie Sing Turner): One of Chrissy's two best friends, she's Asian-American and gains the ability to fly when she and her friends are the Groove Squad (her supersuit is also blue). Though Ping can be kind of ditzy and melodramatic, she's easily the nicest member of the Groove Squad and does have her moments of brilliance. She and Zeke (the team mascot and the Groove Squad's closest male friend) have feelings for each other and presumably become a couple, as they're shown together at their school's dance at the end of the movie.

Mackenzie (Bettina Bush): Nicknamed "Mac", she's best friends with Chrissy and Ping and is the smartest and most mature of the three. She's African-American (or multiracial), with dark skin, dark hair and green eyes. Mac gains the power of X-ray vision, and her supersuit is green. Unlike Chrissy (who has Fernando) and Ping (who has Zeke), Mac didn't have an established crush or love interest—at the end of the movie, Adrienne sets her up with a young friend of his (possibly one of his other clients) named Derek, who happens to be a student at Bay City High School and has a 4.0 GPA.

Zeke (Andrew Francis): The closest male friend of the trio who's also their high school mascot. Although he never gained superpowers like any of the girls, he ultimately proves to be a valuable ally, such as helping to keep their identities as superheroes a secret and helping them on missions. Adrien adds a lot of upgrades to Zeke's car to help him and the girls out on superhero missions. Also, while not an official cheerleader, Zeke proves to be very good at the sport when he takes Star's place in a routine at the end of the movie and ultimately helps the rest of the squad win the cheerleading championship they had spent so much time practicing for. He and Ping have feelings for each other and the two ultimately end up dating.

Adrienne (Blu Mankuma): Originally from England, Adrienne's a hairstylist who helps Chrissy and her friends learn to use their newfound superpowers to ultimately defeat Dr. Nightingale and his plans for world domination. After the girls' first gain their powers and have their first encounter with Dr. Nightingale, Adrienne reveals that before becoming a hairstylist in Bay City, he spent some time working as an Mi6-agent (according to Dr. Nightingale, Adrienne's code name was "0064.2") and ran into Dr. Nightingale a few times. He also spent some time working in the fashion industry and gives the girls special containers that hold their fruit smoothies that makes the girls transform into their superhero-forms. He has a pet dog named Napoleon and at the very end of the movie, he sets Mac up with a young friend of his (possibly one of his other clients) named Derek, who's a student at Bay City High School and has a 4.0 GPA.

Antagonists 
Dr. Nathaniel Nightingale (Mackenzie Gray): The principal villain of the story, he's a power-hungry mad scientist bent on world domination, which he has tried numerous times but has never succeeded. He first meets Chrissy, Ping, and Mac when they save him and his main sidekick, Larry the Cyborg, after his Brain Buster-laser malfunctions early on in the movie. Later on, he's revealed to be an old enemy of Adrienne's from his days as an Mi6-agent in England. He's also eventually revealed to be Star's dad, and despite being a big-time supervillain, he and Star seem to genuinely love each other, just as any other father-and-daughter would.

Larry (Alec Willows): Dr. Nightingale's cyborg sidekick. While he is loyal to his boss, Larry's rather cowardly and unintelligent, and also doesn't seem to be as evil as his boss. Larry mentions in his first appearance in the movie that he and Dr. Nightingale have known each other for at least fifteen years.

Flower Power: A trio of superpowered hippies who're hired by Dr. Nightingale as a way to distract the Groove Squad in a plan to not only prevent them from stopping him from achieving world domination, but also to help his daughter, Star, become head cheerleader at Bay City High School. The group consists of two men (one's a redhead and the other is a blonde with a beard) and one woman (an African-American woman). They were zapped by the same jolt of electricity that gave the Groove Squad their superpowers—just like the girls, Flower Power gained superpowers as well (though their powers involve using their hair as extra limbs).

Other
Star Nightingale (Meghan Black): One of Chrissy, Ping and Mac's fellow cheerleaders at Bay City High School, Star's a redhead with brown eyes and fair skin and is your stereotypical high school "Mean Girl". Star's more a rival to Chrissy than she is to Ping or Mac, and desperately wants to take her place as their school's head cheerleader—also like Chrissy, Star has a crush on Fernando and wants to steal him from Chrissy. Star's eventually revealed to be Dr. Nightingale's daughter and is arguably just as evil as he is (though much like Bonnie Rockwaller, Star's more "high school evil" than "regular evil"). It's unknown if Star knows about her dad's life as a supervillain and it's also unknown who Star's mother is, as she's never seen or mentioned throughout the movie. Star ends up hurting her ankle near the end of the movie, leaving her unable to perform at the cheerleading competition she and the rest of the squad were practicing for, leading Zeke to take her place for it.

Stacy and Roxanne (Vanessa Morley and Kathleen Barr, respectively): A pair of identical twin sisters (with brown hair, green eyes and tanned skin) who're also Star's best friends and two more of Chrissy, Ping and Mac's fellow cheerleaders. They appear to be the tallest people on the Bay City High School-cheerleading squad, as they're shown to be noticeably taller than not just Star, but also Chrissy, Ping and Mac. For most of the movie, they're very eager to please Star and are typically in on her plans to take Chrissy's place as the head cheerleader, but when not under Star's influence, they seem like genuinely nice girls. For example, after Star hurts her ankle and is unable to perform in the cheerleading competition that she and the rest of the squad had been preparing for, they ultimately ditch Star to continue performing with Chrissy and her friends. Also, before Chrissy and her friends managed to get back in time for the competition and Star decided to declare herself as the head cheerleader, the twins seemed a little unsure about having Star as their new team captain.

Fernando (Santo Lombardo): A handsome, Spanish-speaking foreign exchange student who's on the football team at Bay City High School. Both Chrissy and Star have a crush on him, and the rest of the cheerleaders also seem to find him attractive. Fernando often refers to himself in the third person and often refers to Chrissy as "Señorita Chrissy". Despite being a bit of a chick magnet, Fernando really only seems to have feelings for Chrissy, and often tries asking her to go out with him—the first time he tries asking her out, it's under the excuse of wanting Chrissy to help him get a better understanding of American slang. Later, he tries hanging out with Chrissy while she and her friends are practicing their cheerleading at the park. Fernando asks Chrissy to be his date for a school dance that's being held after the cheerleading competition, which Chrissy agrees to.

References

External links
 
 Groove Squad (2002) at Ovguide.com

2002 television films
Nickelodeon original films
American children's animated science fiction films
American children's animated superhero films
2000s animated superhero films
2000s superhero comedy films
DIC Entertainment films
Superhero television characters
2002 animated films
2002 films
2000s American films
2000s French films